The Dalit Sujag Tehreek (DST) is a movement and organisation representing the scheduled caste Hindu  communities in Pakistan. Its core committee consists of 21 people from different scheduled caste Hindu communities such as Kolhi, Bheel, Meghwar, Oad, Bhagri.

History

The movement was launched in 2016 during the 125th anniversary of the birth of Baba Saheb Ambedkar at Mirpurkhas. It was formed by the combination of different Scheduled Caste organisations in Pakistan like Bheel Intellectual Forum (BIF), Oad Samaji Tanzeem, Pakistan Meghwar Council, Baghri Welfare Association, All Sindh Kolhi Association, Sindh Kolhi Itehad (Nemdas group), Sindh Kolhi Itehad (Ranshal Group),  Qaumi Awami Tehreek and the Scheduled Caste Federation of Pakistan (SCFP). It was launched as a campaign against social discrimination faced by scheduled caste Hindus in Pakistan from both Muslims and upper caste Hindus. 

Although Scheduled caste Hindus form majority of the Hindu population in Pakistan, they are underrepresented in the political sphere. According to the Radha Bheel the Pakistan Hindu Council (PHC) has about 2,000 Hindu members, among them only 7 are from Scheduled Castes.

Activities

The DST has formed protests against forced Conversion of scheduled caste Hindu girls to Islam. 
The DST has made campaigns to make the Scheduled Caste Hindu community to put their religion as Scheduled Caste Hindus rather than just Hindus in the Census. 
 DST members has contesting elections under the DST banner.

Politics

During the formation of the DST, Chander Kolhi, the leader of Progressive Human Front said that the DST will take shape of a Dalit political party in Pakistan.  In the 2018 Pakistan General Election, five members of DST including 3 women contesting General elections under the DST banner.

See also
 Hinduism in Pakistan

References

Hindu organisations based in Pakistan
Dalit politics